Butkevich or Butkevych (Буткевич) is an East Slavic surname. Notable people with the surname include:

Georgy Butkevich
Paul Butkevich
Mikhail Butkevich
Olga Butkevych, Ukrainian-born British wrestler
Aleh Butkevich, bishop of the Roman Catholic Diocese of Vitebsk